George Weiss may refer to:

George David Weiss (1921–2010), American songwriter
George Herbert Weiss (1930–2017), American mathematician
George Henry Weiss (1898–1946), American writer
George Weiss (baseball) (1894–1972), American baseball executive
George Weiss (producer), American film producer
George Michael Weiss (1697–1762), Dutch Reformed clergyman who worked in New York and Pennsylvania

See also 
Rainbow George Weiss (1940–2021), UK politician